The American Society of Cinematographers Award for Outstanding Achievement in Cinematography in Motion Picture, Limited Series, or Pilot Made for Television is an annual award given by the American Society of Cinematographers to cinematographers working in the field of television film, limited series or television pilots (or the first episode of a series). It has been awarded, in some capacity, since 1986. From 2009 to 2013, pilot episodes were moved in competition with regular series, but returned in 2014, where it has since remained.

Winners and nominees

1980s

1990s

2000s

2010s

2020s

Cinematographers with multiple wins

4 wins
 Robbie Greenberg
 Donald M. Morgan

2 wins
 Pierre Gill
 Philip H. Lathrop
 Gayne Rescher
 William Wages

Cinematographers with multiple nominations

8 nominations
 William Wages

6 nominations
 Donald M. Morgan

5 nominations
 Thomas Del Ruth

4 nominations
 David Franco
 Ronald Víctor García
 Robbie Greenberg
 Rene Ohashi
 Kees Van Oostrum 
 Gayne Rescher
 Brian J. Reynolds

3 nominations
 Robert Draper
 Paul Elliott
 Jonathan Freeman
 Pierre Gill
 Michael Goi
 Ernest Holzmann
 Shelly Johnson
 Alar Kivilo
 Isidore Mankofsky
 Eric Van Haren Noman 
 Bill Roe
 Bing Sokolsky
 Peter Wunstorf

2 nominations
 Martin Ahlgren
 Oliver Bokelberg
 Alan Caso
 Mathias Herndl
 Florian Hoffmeister
 Shane Hurlbut
 Jon Joffin
 Jeffrey Jur
 Jacek Laskus 
 Philip H. Lathrop
 Peter Levy
 Clark Mathis
 Michael Mayers
 Kramer Morgenthau
 Ben Nott
 Phedon Papamichael
 Edward J. Pei
 Neil Roach
 Ashley Rowe
 Martin Ruhe
 David Stockton

References

American Society of Cinematographers Awards
Awards for best cinematography